Jack Sholder (born June 8, 1945 in Philadelphia, Pennsylvania) is a retired American director, best known for his work in the horror film genre, notably Alone in the Dark, A Nightmare on Elm Street 2: Freddy's Revenge, The Hidden, and Wishmaster 2: Evil Never Dies.

In the DVD commentary of The Hidden, Jack Sholder states that his favorite film director is Jean Renoir.

In September 2004, he joined the faculty of Western Carolina University in the Department of Stage and Screen, retiring in 2017.

During his interview for Behind the Curtain Part II (2012), he confessed that of all the films he had made, Arachnid (2001) was his least favorite. In the same interview, he cited Alone in the Dark (1982), The Hidden (1987), By Dawn's Early Light (1990), and 12:01 (1993) as his favorite of his own films.

Career 
Jack Sholder studied English literature, but fell in love with movies while in college. He made a number of short films, one of them being The Garden Party (1973), based on the short story by Katherine Mansfield. The film starred Jessica Harper, Beatrice Straight, and Tracey Walter. In a 2020 interview Sholder declared that The Garden Party shows "the director I wanted to be, instead of where fate has taken me."

After graduating college, Sholder moved to New York City, with plans of becoming an editor. Through a mutual friend, he met Robert Shaye of New Line, for whom he edited trailers, foreign films, and title sequences on a regular basis. After Friday the 13th had become a hit, New Line was looking to make its own horror movie. Sholder then came up with the idea of Alone in the Dark, which he wrote and directed. In a 2020 interview, Sholder said: "Bob [Shaye] trusted me with the film, because I was an editor and he knew I would get all the pieces. Whether the pieces would be any good, who knows? But at least he knew he would have a film."

Sholder went on to make A Nightmare on Elm Street Part 2: Freddy's Revenge for New Line, which was a commercial success. He got offered "about every horror script in Hollywood", as he tells it in a 2020 interview. But Sholder did not want to do any more horror movies.  New Line offered him The Hidden, a hybrid of Cop movie, Action, and Sci-Fi. The Hidden proved that Sholder had a flair for action movies. Although it was not a commercial success, it had been a calling card for Sholder. As he said in an interview: "It tested through the roof, like it was gonna be a huge hit. (...) But the movie never broke through. Everybody in Hollywood loved it. I was a hot director for about six months. (...) Then things started to cool down and I knew I had to do a movie." That's when Sholder accepted an offer from Universal to make Renegades.

Filmography

Film

Television 
TV movies
 Vietnam War Story II (1988)
 By Dawn's Early Light (1990)
 12:01 (1993)
 Natural Selection (1994)
 Sketch Artist II: Hands That See  (1995)
 Generation X (1996)
 Runaway Car (1997)
 12 Days of Terror (2004)

TV series

References

External links

American film directors
Horror film directors
Living people
1945 births
Writers from Philadelphia
American male screenwriters
Screenwriters from Pennsylvania